John Drummond (13 April 1870 – 24 January 1935) was a Scottish footballer who played as a left back for Falkirk, Rangers and the Scotland national team.

Career
Drummond joined Rangers from Falkirk (who had yet to join the Scottish Football League) in 1892. Over the next 12 years he went on to win five Scottish Cup medals (1894, 1897, 1898, 1899 and 1903) and four consecutive league titles (1898–99, 1899–1900, 1900–01 and 1901–02) – the first of which involved Rangers winning all 18 of their Scottish league matches (although Drummond only played in five).

He finished his playing career with first club Falkirk, latterly becoming their coach then, eventually, a director.

Drummond was capped 14 times by Scotland between 1892 and 1903. He captained his country on four occasions. He also played for the Scottish Football League XI.

Drummond was inducted into the Rangers F.C. Hall of Fame in 2011. He is notable for being the last outfield player in Scottish football to wear a cap while playing.

See also
List of Scotland national football team captains

References

1870 births
1935 deaths
Association football defenders
Falkirk F.C. non-playing staff
Falkirk F.C. players
Sportspeople from Clackmannanshire
Rangers F.C. players
Scotland international footballers
Scottish Football League players
Scottish Football League representative players
Scottish footballers
Place of death missing